Sindo, also known as Jinyeom, is an island off the coast of Incheon, South Korea. During the Joseon Dynasty, a huge horse ranch was constructed on Sindo to suit the army's need. The landscape features several peaks, including Gubong-San. The island is suitable for agriculture, and many of the residents works as farmers and/or fishermen.

Sindo is home to Gobongsan Mt. and Sindo Lake. It is connected to Sido island by a bridge. Ferries run between Sindo and Yeong Jong island where Incheon International Airport is located.

References 

Islands of Incheon
Ongjin County, Incheon